Ilyophis nigeli is an eel in the family Synaphobranchidae (cutthroat eels). It was described by Yuri Nikolaevich Shcherbachev and Kenneth J. Sulak in 1997.<ref name="Shcherbachev & Sulak, 1997">Sulak, K. J. and Yu. N. Shcherbachev, 1997 [ref. 22986] Zoogeography and systematics of six deep-living genera of synaphobranchid eels, with a key to taxa and description of two new species of Ilyophis. Bulletin of Marine Science v. 60 (no. 3): 1158-1194.</ref> It is a marine, deep water-dwelling eel which is known from Japan, in the northwestern Pacific Ocean.

Etymology
The species epithet "nigeli''" was given in honour of Nigel R. Merrett, credited with making "substantial contributions" to the knowledge of the synaphobranchid eels.

References

Synaphobranchidae
Taxa named by Yuri Nikolaevich Shcherbachev
Fish described in 1997